David Benjamin Bolen (December 23, 1923 – December 10, 2022) was an American track and field athlete, Olympian, diplomat and businessman.

Biography
Bolen competed at the 1948 Summer Olympics in the 400 metres. He finished fourth in the final behind Arthur Wint, Herb McKenley and Mal Whitfield. In 2012, Bolen told The Boulder Daily Camera that "The Olympics is not something you train for. You have to have talent, world-class talent. You have to use that talent for the benefit of yourself and others." Bolen first discovered that he had that talent when he raced other children during an Easter egg hunt during his childhood and found that he was faster. He later decided he wanted to use his "foot speed" to gain a college education.

Bolen graduated from the University of Colorado Boulder in 1950, and was the university's first Olympic athlete. Before serving for two years in the Army Air Force in WWII, he attended Southern University in New Orleans; after his service, he was recruited by CU Boulder track and field coach Frank Potts.

Later, Bolen's career took him to the US State Department. In 1974, President Richard Nixon appointed him ambassador to Swaziland, Lesotho and Botswana simultaneously, while keeping residence in Gaborone. In 1977, the German-speaking Bolen was appointed by President Jimmy Carter and confirmed as US Ambassador to the German Democratic Republic. He was the first African-American to serve as ambassador to a nation behind the Iron Curtain. He served until 1980. As an ambassador to East Germany, Bolen helped to lay the groundwork for the destruction of the Berlin Wall. On November 9, 1989, the day the wall came down, Bolen's daughter, Cynthia, was photographed handing a long-stemmed rose to an East German border guard standing atop the wall. He also worked to help free Nelson Mandela from prison.

Bolen died on December 10, 2022, at the age of 98.

Competition record

References

http://www.blackpast.org/aah/bolen-david-benjamin-1923
https://web.archive.org/web/20140212082044/http://www.coloradanmagazine.org/2013/03/01/running-down-dream/
http://www.cubuffs.com/ViewArticle.dbml?ATCLID=920399
http://www.presidency.ucsb.edu/ws/index.php?pid=7770 United States Ambassador to the German Democratic Republic Nomination of David B. Bolen.
July 8, 1977
http://www.dailycamera.com/ci_21168978/first-cu-boulder-olympian-games-are-not-something

1923 births
2022 deaths
Olympic track and field athletes of the United States
American male sprinters
Athletes (track and field) at the 1948 Summer Olympics
Ambassadors of the United States to East Germany
20th-century American diplomats
Ambassadors of the United States to Botswana
Ambassadors of the United States to Lesotho
Ambassadors of the United States to Eswatini
Harvard University alumni
African-American diplomats
People from Heflin, Louisiana
Military personnel from Louisiana
Track and field athletes from Louisiana
United States Foreign Service personnel
United States Army Air Forces personnel of World War II
20th-century African-American people
21st-century African-American people